Jockey Hollow is the name for an area in southern Morris County, New Jersey farmed in the 18th century by the Wick, Guerin and Kemble families.  The origin of the name is still uncertain, but was used as such at the time of the American Revolution.  For most of the  Revolutionary War, it was used by portions of Continental Army as a winter camp site, and it housed the main Continental Army during the "Hard Winter" of 1779–80, believed to be the harshest winter in recorded history.  
It is located in Harding Township and Mendham Township, in Morris County, New Jersey. Since 1933, the Wick House has been part of Morristown National Historical Park in Morristown, New Jersey. Morristown National Historical Park is administered by the National Park Service, U.S. Department of the Interior.

American Revolutionary War
During the Revolutionary War, Henry Wick possessed the largest portion of this area—his farm comprised 1400 acres of timber and open field. The Wick farm and his neighbors' property were considered the ideal location for a winter camp due to the distance from British forces in New York and the amount of timber needed for shelter and firewood for a large army—and the availability of houses for officers (mainly generals and their staff) to quarter.  During the winter of 1779–1780, approximately 600 acres of timber in Wick land and about 2000 acres total in Jockey Hollow were cut down by the soldiers to be used for the construction of huts and as firewood.

The Wick House
In the spring of 1777, the Wick family hosted Captain Joseph Bloomfield.

During the Winter of 1779–1780, the Wicks housed General Arthur St. Clair, who was then commander of the Pennsylvania Line, and several of his aides.

The house is now restored and is one of the historic structures maintained and open for viewing at the Morristown National Historical Park—see park website for schedule, https://www.nps.gov/morr/index.htm

Wick Kitchen Garden 
A kitchen garden next to the Wick House is maintained by the Northern New Jersey unit of Herb Society of America.

The "Hard Winter" at Jockey Hollow
During the Winter of 1779–1780, the Wicks housed General Arthur St. Clair, who was then commander of the Pennsylvania Line, and several of his aides.

In December 1779, over 10.000 Continental Army troops encamped for the winter at Jockey Hollow. Soldiers camped at this location until June 1780, during which time they endured some of the harshest conditions of the war. Due to the bad conditions of the dirt roads in the winter and spring, dependence on horsepower, distance from the enemy in New York plus the natural walls of protection provided by the (now-called) Watchung Mountains, this was a secure area to camp the army.

The Winter at Jockey Hollow was the worst winter of the war, even worse than the Winter at Valley Forge two years before. Twelve men often shared one of over one thousand simple huts built in Jockey Hollow to house the Army. Amazingly, despite the difficult conditions and lack of food, fewer than 100 soldiers died and only one out of ten deserted.

Soldier housing

Soldiers had to build their own huts including surrounding trenches for drainage. Twelve men often shared one of over one thousand simple huts built in Jockey Hollow to house the army. Inside the huts soldiers had a fireplace for warmth and cooking. To create a floor they  packed the ground for an earthen floor. Soldiers also had to make their own furniture, including bunks and tables. Their bunks got covered with straw and each soldier was to be given one blanket, although Washington claimed that a quarter of the men "did not have the shadow of a blanket." . Soldiers huts were about 2 to 3 ft (50–100 cm) apart, with three rows of eight huts for each regiment. By 1780, soldiers had built about 1,200 huts in Jockey Hollow.

There are four replica huts on Sugar Loaf hill built in 1964.

There is a 1932 marker to the "Jockey Hollow Hospital" just across the road from those replica huts—subsequent archeology done after Morristown National Historical Park was esptablished found no evidence of graves there.

Pennsylvania Line mutiny of 1781

On December 21, 1780, Henry Wick died at Jockey Hollow. On the evening of January 1781, the Pennsylvania Line, then encamped in Jockey Hollow  under the command of General Anthony Wayne mutinied.  They supposedly intended to march to Philadelphia to complain to the state legislature. Many soldiers believed their enlistments in the army had expired with the new year, but the army claimed that their enlistment terms "two years or during the war" meant the end of the war was their true duration.  The mutineers reached Princeton, New Jersey, where Pennsylvania's chief executive Joseph Reed and representatives of the Supreme Executive Council of Pennsylvania negotiated with them.  The mutiny ended peacefully—some of the soldiers agreed to stay in the army.  The event is believed to be the largest mutiny in the course of the American Revolutionary War.

The most famous account of this mutiny is Carl Van Doren's book, Mutiny in January, published in 1943.

Facilities
Jockey Hollow Visitor Center
Wick House: Park employee in period dress.

Activities
Biking (road only)
Bird Watching
Hiking
Interpretive Programs
Snow Skiing
Children's Junior Ranger Program

See also
New Jersey Brigade Encampment Site - Used by the New Jersey Brigade during the same winter encampment
Temperance Wick 
William W. Wick 
Hilton Wick
Valley Forge
Craig House
Washington Rock State Park

Notes

External links
 Morristown National Historical Park: The Great Story 
 The Hard Winter of 1779–80

American Revolutionary War sites
Houses on the National Register of Historic Places in New Jersey
Harding Township, New Jersey
Mendham Township, New Jersey
Historic house museums in New Jersey
American Revolutionary War museums in New Jersey
Museums in Morristown, New Jersey
Morristown National Historical Park
Parks in Morris County, New Jersey
National Register of Historic Places in Morris County, New Jersey
Houses in Morris County, New Jersey
American Revolution on the National Register of Historic Places